Two Jims and Zoot (also reissued as Otra Vez)  is an album by guitarists Jimmy Raney and Jim Hall with saxophonist Zoot Sims which was recorded in 1964 for the Mainstream label.

Reception

AllMusic awarded the album 4½ stars and its review by Scott Yanow states "The cool-toned improvisations and boppish playing have a timeless quality about them although for the time period aspects of this music already sounded a bit old-fashioned".

Track listing
 "Hold Me" (Gerry Mulligan) - 2:55
 "A Primera Vez" (Alcebíades Barcelos, Armando Marçal) - 4:19
 "Presente de Natal" (Nelcy Noronha) - 3:06
 "Morning of the Carnival" (Luiz Bonfá, Antônio Maria) - 4:34
 "Este Seu Olhar" (Antônio Carlos Jobim) - 4:35   
 "Betaminus" (R. Ellen) - 3:18   
 "Move It" (Jim Hall) - 4:25  
 "All Across the City" (Hall) - 4:48  
 "Coisa Mais Linda" (Carlos Lyra, Vinicius de Moraes) - 4:20   
 "How About You?" (Leo Feist) - 3:52

Personnel 
Jimmy Raney, Jim Hall - guitar
Zoot Sims - tenor saxophone 
Steve Swallow - bass
Osie Johnson - drums

References 

1964 albums
Jimmy Raney albums
Jim Hall (musician) albums
Zoot Sims albums
Mainstream Records albums